Epimolis is a genus of moths in the family Erebidae. The genus was erected by Harrison Gray Dyar Jr. in 1913.

Species

 Epimolis affinis (Rothschild, 1909)
 Epimolis arcifera (Dognin, 1912)
 Epimolis conifera (Dognin, 1912)
 Epimolis creon Druce, 1897
 Epimolis flavonotata (Rothschild, 1909)
 Epimolis haemastica (Dognin, 1906)
 Epimolis incarnata (Hampson, 1901)
 Epimolis marpessa (Druce, 1906)
 Epimolis pseudopraemolis (Rothschild, 1909)
 Epimolis ridenda (Dognin, 1911)
 Epimolis syrissa (Druce, 1906)
 Epimolis zatrephica Dyar, 1913

Former species
 Epimolis incisa (Rothschild, 1909)

References

External links

Phaegopterina
Moth genera